William West Neve (7 June 1852 – 26 December 1942) was a minor English architect in the Arts and Crafts style.

Career

Neve was educated at Cheltenham College, Gloucestershire and began his architectural training as an assistant in the office of Richard Norman Shaw before leaving in 1877 to practice on his own at No.4 Chilworth Street, London and later from 1878 at No.5 Bloomsbury Square, London.  In 1882, Neve worked in partnership with fellow ex-Norman Shaw pupil Ernest Newton.

Neve regularly had his work published in journals and was also a regular exhibitor at the Royal Academy in London.

Notes on built works

St Martin of Tours Church, Chelsfield
In 1893, Neve (with assistance from architect and churchwarden Frank Brind) proposed a design to remodel elements of St Martin of Tours Church, Chelsfield, Kent.  This included the construction of a vestry and the installation of a new organ.  The original drawings for this scheme are preserved in the library of Canterbury Cathedral.

Kingsbury Manor
In 1899, Neve designed a large halftimbered manor house at Roe Green Park, London for Mary, dowager Duchess of Sutherland, the wife of Sir Albert Kaye Rollit, M.P.

Moniaive
Several Arts and Crafts style buildings by Neve were commissioned by his sister Ellen Maria Monteith – the widow of Glencairn Parish Minister John Monteith - in the village of Moniaive in south-west Scotland, including St. Ninian’s Chapel of Ease (1887), Glenluiart (1901) and an L-shaped row of cottages at Dunreggan (1906).  Neve's drawings of Glenluiart are held at the Archive Centre, Dumfries, under the title of 'House at Craigdarroch'.

Gallery

Photographs

References

External links
Randolph Caldecott – The Chelsfield Connection.
'Hollowforth' - E Jeaffreson Jackson's Richard Threfall House, 1891-92.

1852 births
1942 deaths
Architects from Kent
Arts and Crafts architects
People from Cranbrook, Kent